Triocnemidina is a subtribe of owlet moths in the family Noctuidae. There are about 16 genera and at least 30 described species in Triocnemidina.

Genera
 Acopa Harvey, 1875
 Airamia Barnes & Benjamin, 1926
 Aleptina Dyar, 1902
 Anycteola Barnes & Benjamin, 1929
 Copibryophila Smith, 1900
 Crimona Smith, 1902
 Eviridemas Barnes & Benjamin, 1929
 Fota Grote, 1882
 Gloanna Nye, 1975
 Leucocnemis Hampson, 1908
 Metaponpneumata Möschler, 1890
 Nacopa Barnes & Benjamin, 1924
 Oxycnemis Grote, 1882
 Policocnemis Benjamin, 1932
 Triocnemis Grote, 1881
 Unciella Troubridge, 2008

References

 Lafontaine, J. Donald & Schmidt, B. Christian (2010). "Annotated check list of the Noctuoidea (Insecta, Lepidoptera) of North America north of Mexico". ZooKeys, vol. 40, 1-239.

Further reading

External links

 Butterflies and Moths of North America

Amphipyrinae